Lark is an unincorporated community in the town of Morrison, Brown County, Wisconsin, United States. It is located on Wisconsin Highway 96.

Notes

Images

Unincorporated communities in Brown County, Wisconsin
Unincorporated communities in Wisconsin
Green Bay metropolitan area